Clevedon is a town and civil parish in the unitary authority of North Somerset, England.

Clevedon may also refer to:

Clevedon, New Zealand, a rural town in New Zealand
Clevedon (New Zealand electorate), a former electorate, 1987–1993 and 2002–2008
Clevedon, Queensland, an area within the City of Townsville, Queensland, Australia

See also
Cliveden